Not That Kind is the debut studio album by American singer Anastacia. It was released on June 16, 2000, by Epic Records and Daylight Records. The album features production by Sam Watters, Louis Biancaniello, Ric Wake, Evan Rogers, Carl Sturken, Rickey Minor, and The Shadowmen.

Not That Kind failed to make an impact in the United States, where it peaked at number 168 on the Billboard 200. Nevertheless, it was commercially successful overseas, reaching the top 10 on the majority of the charts in Europe and Oceania. By May 2002, the album had sold over seven million copies worldwide.

Track listing

Notes
  signifies an additional producer
  signifies a remixer

Sample credits
 "Don'tcha Wanna" contains portions of "I Believe (When I Fall in Love It Will Be Forever)" by Stevie Wonder.

Charts

Weekly charts

Year-end charts

Certifications

Release history

References

2000 debut albums
Albums produced by Ric Wake
Albums produced by Sam Watters
Anastacia albums
Daylight Records albums
Epic Records albums